Triplophysa furva is a species of stone loach in the genus Triplophysa endemic to China. It was first described from near Ürümqi, Xinjiang.

References

F
Freshwater fish of China
Endemic fauna of China
Fish described in 1992